Tony DeMarco (January 14, 1932 – October 11, 2021), born Leonardo Liotta, was an American boxer and World Welterweight Champion. Born to Sicilian immigrants from Sciacca (AG), Vincent and Giacomina, DeMarco grew up in the North End neighborhood of Boston.

DeMarco was also, for a short time, a resident of Phoenix, Arizona, where he was a business owner and where he suffered the death of his young son by way of a car-bicycle collision.

Career
Due to the minimum age of eighteen, in order to box professionally, Liotta used the birth certificate of Tony DeMarco so that he could compete. DeMarco had his first professional fight when he was sixteen years old. On October 21, 1948, he knocked out Mestor Jones in one round.

DeMarco fought the top fighters in his division during the 1950s and defeated top contenders and champions like Paddy DeMarco, Teddy "Red Top" Davis, Chico Vejar, and Don Jordan. The highlight of his career came on April 1, 1955, when he scored a technical knock out (TKO) over Johnny Saxton in the 14th round of their title bout to capture the world's welterweight title.

Despite winning many bouts to become champion, he is best remembered for his two championship matches with hall of famer Carmen Basilio in 1955. Both fights were toe to toe slugfests with several ebbs and flows that kept the fans at the edges of their seats. Both fights ended in the 12th round with DeMarco suffering a TKO. In their first bout, DeMarco was the defending champion. He risked his title by taking on Basilio, who was the top ranked contender. Although Basilio prevailed, the fight was so exciting that the pair were rematched. The second fight was almost a carbon copy of the first with Basilio wearing down DeMarco, but not before a wicked DeMarco left hook had Basilio out on his feet. DeMarco was unable to capitalize on this advantage and lost the match on a 12-round TKO.

Legacy
  
DeMarco's legacy is an undying part of Boston's history. Training under Boston greats such as Frankie Waters, DeMarco was able to sell out the Boston Garden, breaking attendance records. Mayor Thomas Menino even honored DeMarco with a street, named after him, in Boston's famous North End. The street, which is perpendicular to Atlantic Avenue, is named "Tony DeMarco Way".

DeMarco received many honors, including an induction in the Official National Italian American Hall of Fame in Chicago. Looking back on his career, DeMarco remarked "Mainly I consider myself a slugger." DeMarco once fought on the undercard to Rocky Marciano. Boxing, Boston and Tony DeMarco
In his last bout, DeMarco won a ten-round decision over Stefan Redl in Boston on February 6, 1962.

A statue of DeMarco unveiled on October 20, 2012, at the corners of Hanover and Cross Streets in Boston's historic North End was designed by sculptor Harry Weber, and a full-length documentary by filmmaker Marino Amoruso based on DeMarco's autobiography Nardo: Memoirs of a Boxing Champion is in the works. DeMarco was also featured in "The Flame and Fury of Fleet Street," a segment of the documentary, Boston's North End: An Italian American Story.

DeMarco was inducted into the International Boxing Hall of Fame as a member of the class of 2019.

Professional boxing record

See also
List of welterweight boxing champions

References

External links

1932 births
2021 deaths
People from North End, Boston
American people of Italian descent
Welterweight boxers
American male boxers
People from Phoenix, Arizona
International Boxing Hall of Fame inductees